The list of coin hoards in China lists significant archaeological hoards of coins, other types of coinages (e.g. sycees) or objects related to coins discovered in China (the People's Republic of China in Mainland China, Hong Kong, Macau, and the Free area of the Republic of China, e.g. Taiwan). The history of Chinese currency dates back as early as the Spring and Autumn period (770–476 BCE), and the earliest coinages took the form of imitations of the cowrie shells that were used in ceremonial exchanges. During the Warring States period new forms of currency such as the spade money, knife money, and round copper-alloy coins were introduced (further reading: Zhou dynasty coinage and Ancient Chinese coinage). After unification of China under the Qin dynasty in 221 BC the Ban Liang (半兩) cash coin became the standard coinage, under the Han dynasty the Wu Zhu (五銖) cash coins became the main currency of China until they were replaced with the Kaiyuan Tongbao (開元通寳) during the Tang dynasty, after which a large number of inscriptions were used on Chinese coinages. During the late nineteenth century China started producing its own machine-struck coinages. 

In Chinese culture coins are often used as burial objects and it's not uncommon for coins to be discovered in tombs and graves. 

Occasionally foreign coins are also found in China, which were brought there through international trade routes such as the silk road, overseas trade with foreign countries, and colonialism. And because of trade with other countries large quantities of Chinese coins have also been found in neighbouring countries like Japan, Korea, and Vietnam, as well as far away places like Elcho Island, Kenya, and Yukon.

In 2021 a paper was published about an old mint that was discovered at an archeological site in Henan Province, through radiocarbon-dating the spade money found there was attributed to have been created between 640 BCE and no later than 550 BCE making it possibly the world's oldest known mint. This means that it is possible that the earliest known coinage was invented by the Chinese and not the Lydians as is commonly believed.

Cleaning of coins by Chinese archaeologists  

As Chinese archaeologists frequently unearth ancient Chinese cash coins and other forms of historical currency at tomb sites, these unearthed bronze coinages are often severely corroded because they have been buried for hundreds or thousands of years, this sometimes means that the inscriptions on them can't be read. While archaeologists working at a site tend to do everything very slowly and do it as methodically as possible to avoid doing any damage to the buried cultural relics, this approach isn't taken with cash coins because they are often vital to date the tombs or ruins. With ancient Chinese cash coins archaeologists tend to be less concerned about their preservation and clean them to identify them. 

To clean bronze cash coins Chinese archaeologists will simply put them in a mild acid like vinegar to soak for a period of 2 or 3 days, after this process is done the surface dirt and some of the corrosion will be removed. The cash coins are then removed by the person doing the cleaning, and they will them scrape out any leftover corrosion in the Chinese characters by using a (common) toothpick. After this process is done, a rubbing is usually made of the unearthed coins. 

On the contrary, it is usually said among coin collectors to not clean their coins because the cleaning process will often lessen the coin's market value or in some cases even ruin it. 

Because of the high frequency of the discovery of coin hoards in China uncleaned coin hoards from other countries are frequently send to China for cleaning and assessment. For example, someone discovered a hoard of group of around 400 different 8 reales coins on the border between Mexico and the central American country of Guatemala. These silver coins were mostly produced by the Guatemala mint with others produced by the Mexico and Lima mints, all of which contained portraits of kings Charles IV and Ferdinand VII. As these coins were all too unclean to be deemed "valuable" by coin collectors they were sent to a coin dealer in the Jiangsu, People's Republic of China. Such situations are common as Chinese coin dealers have become experts in removing corrosion from coins to get them graded by numismatic experts and then be sold into the retail market.

1950s

1950s (Mainland China)

1960s

1960s (Mainland China)

1970s

1970s (Mainland China)

1972

1972 (Mainland China)

1974

1974 (Mainland China)

1977

1977 (Mainland China)

1980s

1983

1983 (Mainland China)

1984

1984 (Mainland China)

1990s

1990s (Mainland China)

1990

1990 (Mainland China)

1992

1992 (Mainland China)

1996

1996 (Mainland China)

1997

1997 (Mainland China)

1999

1999 (Mainland China)

2000s

2000

2000 (Mainland China)

2000 (Hong Kong)

2002

2002 (Mainland China)

2005

2005 (Mainland China)

2006

2006 (Mainland China)

2007

2007 (Mainland China)

2008

2008 (Mainland China)

2009

2009 (Mainland China)

2010s

2010

2010 (Mainland China)

2011

2011 (Mainland China)

2011 (Hong Kong)

2012

2012 (Mainland China)

2013

2013 (Mainland China)

2015

2015 (Mainland China)

2016

2016 (Mainland China)

2017

2017 (Mainland China)

2018

2018 (Mainland China)

2020s

2020

2020 (Mainland China)

2021

2021 (Mainland China)

See also  

 List of coin hoards in Vietnam

Notes

References  
 

Hoards
Chinese numismatics 
Archaeology-related lists
Treasure troves of China 
Coin hoards in China
Lists of hoards